Željko Zečević (born 21 October 1963) is a Serbian professional basketball coach, who is the current head coach of SLAC of the Basketball Africa League. He is also the head coach of the Guinea national basketball team.

Coaching career
Born in Belgrade, SR Serbia, SFR Yugoslavia (now Serbia), Zečević started coaching youth teams in 1988 in his hometown.

Zečević started coaching in Italy in 2000, as coach of the Amatori Sniadero Udine junior team. In the 2003–04 season, he made his debut with Potenza of the C-1.

From 2015 to 2017, he was the head coach of Chabab Rif Al Hoceima in the Moroccan Division Excellence.

In 2009, he left Italy to coach for Sagesse SC in Lebanon. In 2010, Zečević signed with Wydad AC, his first African club. He would later spend time as the head coach of several teams on the continent.

In 2019, Zečević signed as head coach of SLAC of the Guinean Ligue 1.

National team coaching career
Zečević coached the Egypt national team at the 2009 FIBA AfroBasket and 2011 FIBA AfroBasket.

In February 2021, Zečević took over as head coach of the Guinea national basketball team. He coached the team in the 2021 AfroBasket.

Head coaching record

BAL

|-
| style="text-align:left;"|SLAC
| style="text-align:left;"|2022
| 5||2||3|||| style="text-align:left;"|4th in Sahara Conference||1||0||1||
| style="text-align:center;"|Lost in Quarterfinals
|- class="sortbottom"

References

External links
Zeljko Zecevic at Asia-basket.com
Život posvećen košarci

1963 births
Living people
AS Salé basketball coaches
Basketball Africa League coaches
Sagesse SC basketball coaches
US Monastir basketball coaches
Chabab Rif Al Hoceima basketball coaches
Serbian expatriate basketball people in Bahrain
Serbian expatriate basketball people in Croatia
Serbian expatriate basketball people in Italy
Serbian expatriate basketball people in Egypt
Serbian expatriate basketball people in Guinea
Serbian expatriate basketball people in Lebanon
Serbian expatriate basketball people in Morocco
Serbian expatriate basketball people in Romania
Serbian expatriate basketball people in Tunisia
Serbian men's basketball coaches
Sportspeople from Belgrade
SLAC basketball coaches